Roger Stefan Larsson (born 14 June 1965 in Ludvika, Sweden) is a retired Swedish professional ice hockey player.

Larsson spent most of his career Västra Frölunda apart from two seasons at Leksands IF.  He was drafted 133rd overall by the Detroit Red Wings in the 1984 NHL Entry Draft but remained in Sweden.

References

External links

1965 births
Detroit Red Wings draft picks
Frölunda HC players
Leksands IF players
Living people
Swedish ice hockey defencemen